Stord is a supply chain management company based in Atlanta, Georgia. The company builds cloud supply chain services that include freight, warehousing, and fulfillment solutions. Stord operates its own network of operated facilities as well as partner warehouses, fulfillment centers, and carriers. As of 2022, Stord is classified as a unicorn company.

Funding

References 

American companies established in 2015
Companies based in Atlanta
Supply chain software companies